Department of Education TV (known as DepEd TV) was a Philippine educational UHF television channel of the Department of Education (DepEd) with the assistance of the Presidential Communications Operations Office (PCOO). It was launched on August 11, 2020, beginning its test broadcast. Following the postponement of the starting date of classes however, the block was suspended to October 5 of the same year.

History
DepEd announced the initialization of educational classes through blended learning in the midst of the COVID-19 pandemic in the Philippines. Among many options is to broadcast learning modules on television and radio. The department later tapped state media agency PCOO to assist in producing and airing of lessons and modules.

The service held its test broadcasts from August 11 until 21, 2020 via IBC, Solar Learning and various local/regional stations, but was suspended on the following week after DepEd moved the opening date of its regular classes for the 2020–2021 school year to October 5, 2020.

The service held its second and final test broadcasts from September 21 to 25, 2020.

The service ceased operations on June 30, 2022 during the inauguration of President Bongbong Marcos and in preparation for the return of face-to-face classes.

Networks
Aside from airing on IBC-13 and Solar Learning, DepEd TV also aired its educational programs on other TV channels:
 GMA DTV – 1 terrestrial TV channel
 BEAM TV – 1 terrestrial TV channel
 Cignal – 1 satellite TV channel
 G Sat – 1 satellite TV channel
 Sky Cable in Mega Manila – 1 cable TV channel
 Members of the Philippine Cable and Telecommunications Association (PCTA) – 1 to 3 cable channels for each members
 Planet Cable (Streamtech) (Ilocos Norte) – 1 cable channel
 Gracia Telecommunications (Ilocos Sur) – 1 cable channel
 Various regional UHF television stations in the Philippines
 DZRM 1278 – Radio simulcast

References

External links

Department of Education (Philippines)
Defunct television networks in the Philippines
Educational and instructional television channels
Intercontinental Broadcasting Corporation
Solar Learning
Philippines educational programs
Television networks in the Philippines
Television programming blocks
Television channels and stations established in 2020
Television channels and stations disestablished in 2022
2020 establishments in the Philippines
2022 disestablishments in the Philippines